Sir Frederick Seton James,  (8 April 1870 – 13 February 1934) was a British colonial administrator. He was the Colonial Secretary of the Straits Settlements (1916–1924) and Governor of the Windward Islands (1924–1930).

Education
Sir James was educated at Charterhouse School and overseas.

Career

Colonial Nigeria
He joined the Colonial Service and was posted to the Niger Coast Protectorate in 1896 as Assistant District Commissioner and was in charge at Opobo and Akwete in 1897. He served as Tavelling Commissioner in 1897 and in the expedition against the Ekuris, Cross River in 1898. He settled disputes in Qua country after Central Division Expedition, 1899, received thanks of Mr Chamberlain. He served as Divisional Commissioner in 1901 and was Intelligence and Political Officer with the Aro Field Force in 1901-02 and was mentioned in dispatches for this and received the thanks of the Director of Military Intelligence and Secretary of State in connection with the preparation of map subsequent to Aro operations. He was also with the Kwale Field Force and was appointed Acting Secretary and Deputy High Commissioner in 1905. He became Provincial Commissioner and Member of the Executive and Legislative Councils of Southern Nigeria in 1906 and was Deputy Governor in 1907 and 1908. He was Acting Colonial Secretary several times and acted as Governor and Commander-in-Chief of Southern Nigeria during 1912. 

After Southern Nigeria was joined with Northern Nigeria in 1914, he was made Administrator of the Colony of Lagos until 1916. He was returning home on the  when it was captured as a prize by the German raider .

Federated Malay States and Straits Settlements
From 1916 to 1924, he was Colonial Secretary of the Straits Settlements and was a Food Controller for Malaya between December 1918 and May 1919. He was the Officer Administering the Government and High Commissioner for the Federated Malay States (F.M.S.) between August 1919 and January 1920, and was officiating Chief Secretary F.M.S. 1920.

Windward Islands
In 1924, he was transferred to the Caribbean as Governor of the Windward Islands, where he served until a serious accident in 1930 that force him to retire.

Awards and honours
He was invested Companion of the Order of St Michael and St George (CMG) in 1902, was knighted Knight Commander of the Order of the British Empire (KBE) in 1923 and Knight Commander of the Order of St Michael and St George (KCMG) in 1929.

Personal life
He was born the son of William James, lately of the 42nd Royal Highlanders, of Otterburn Tower, Northumberland. He had married Doris Basevi on 20 January 1917 and had two sons.

Retirement
He retired at Ellerslie near Chichester, Sussex and died in 1934.

References

Notes

1870 births
1934 deaths
People educated at Charterhouse School
British colonial governors and administrators in Africa
Governors of the Windward Islands
Chief Secretaries of Singapore
Administrators in British Singapore